is a Japanese television series starring Hikari Mitsushima and Takeru Satoh, released by Netflix on 24 November 2022. The series (and its Japanese title) was inspired by two Hikaru Utada songs.

Plot 
The plot revolves around a man and a woman who met in the late 1990s as teenagers and grew up together in the early 2000s. After 15 years, they meet again and try to rekindle their first love through memories. Yae wanted to be a flight attendant but suffered an accident. Harumichi served as a pilot in the JASDF but his life took a different path.

Cast
 Hikari Mitsushima as Yae Noguchi
 Rikako Yagi as young Yae
 Takeru Satoh as Harumichi Namiki
 Taisei Kido as young Harumichi
 Kaho as Tsunemi Arikawa
 Minami as Yū Namiki
 Akiyoshi Nakao as Bonji Kawano
 Towa Araki as Tsuzuru Kosaka
 Aoi Yamada as Uta Komori
 Gaku Hamada as Ōtaro

Episodes

Reception 

Phil Harrison from The Guardian wrote that "it’s tasteful, idealised and at times, a little antiseptic: romance as designed by Marie Kondo".

References

2022 Japanese television series debuts
2022 Japanese television series endings
2020s romantic comedy television series
Fiction about amnesia
Japanese romance television series
Japanese-language Netflix original programming
Television series set in the 1990s
Television series set in the 2000s
Television series set in the 2010s
Television series set in the 2020s
Hikaru Utada